Ski orienteering at the 2011 Asian Winter Games was held at Biathlon and Cross-Country Ski Complex in Almaty, Kazakhstan. The eight events were scheduled for January 31– February 5, 2011.

Schedule

Medalists

Men

Women

Medal table

Participating nations
A total of 32 athletes from 6 nations competed in ski orienteering at the 2011 Asian Winter Games:

References

 Results at International Orienteering Federation website

External links
 Official website

 
2011 Asian Winter Games events
2011